This article presents a list of the historical events and publications of Australian literature during 1987.

Events

 Glenda Adams won the 1987 Miles Franklin Award for Dancing on Coral

Major publications

Novels 
 Glenda Adams, Dancing on Coral
 Thomas Keneally, The Playmaker
Eric Willmot, Pemulwuy, the rainbow warrior

Short story anthologies 
 Julie Lewis, The Walls of Jericho: Stories
 Patrick White, Three Uneasy Pieces

Children's and young adult fiction 
 John Marsden, So Much to Tell You

Poetry 
 Judith Beveridge, The Domesticity of Giraffes
 Dorothy Hewett, Alice in Wormland

Drama 
 Dorothy Hewett, Me and the Man in the Moon
 Wendy Richardson, Windy Gully
 David Williamson, Emerald City (play)

Science fiction and fantasy
 Richard Bowker, Dover Beach (novel)
 Isobelle Carmody, Obernewtyn (novel)
 George Turner, The Sea and Summer

Non-fiction 
 Brian Matthews, Louisa
 Sally Morgan, My Place (book)

Awards and honours
 Rosemary Dobson , for "service to literature, particularly in the field of poetry"
 David Malouf , for "service to literature"
 Peter Cowan (writer) , for "service to Australian literature"
 Ruth Park , for "service to literature"
 Rica Erickson , for "service to the arts, particularly as an author and illustrator

Deaths 
A list, ordered by date of death (and, if the date is either unspecified or repeated, ordered alphabetically by surname) of deaths in 1987 of Australian literary figures, authors of written works or literature-related individuals follows, including year of birth.

 3 March — Cyril Pearl, Australian journalist, editor, author, social historian, wit and television personality (born 1904)
 18 April — Kenneth Cook, Australian journalist, television documentary maker and novelist (born 1929)
 8 May — Marjorie Barnard, Australia novelist and short story writer, critic, historian and librarian (born 1897)
 24 May — R. D. Fitzgerald, poet (born 1902)
 3 July — Grace Perry, poet, playwright, and founder and editor of the South Head Press (born 1927)
 17 December — Lucy Walker (writer), romance novelist (born 1907)

See also 

1987 in Australia
1987 in literature
 1987 in poetry
 List of years in literature
 List of years in Australian literature

References

1987 in Australia
Australian literature by year
20th-century Australian literature
1987 in literature